Shane Gadsdon (born 8 April 1991) is a New Zealand cricketer. He played in two first-class matches for Northern Districts in 2009.

See also
 List of Northern Districts representative cricketers

References

External links
 

1991 births
Living people
New Zealand cricketers
Northern Districts cricketers
Cricketers from Auckland